The 1929–30 William & Mary Indians men's basketball team represented the College of William & Mary as a member of Virginia Conference during the 1929–30 NCAA men's basketball season. Led by first-year head coach John Kellison, the Indians compiled an overall record of 16–6 with a mark of 11–1 in conference play, winning the Virginia Conference title. This was the 25th season of the collegiate basketball program at William & Mary, whose nickname is now the Tribe.

Schedule

|-
!colspan=9 style="background:#006400; color:#FFD700;"| Regular season

Source

References

William and Mary
William & Mary Tribe men's basketball seasons
William and Mary Indians basketball, men's
William and Mary Indians basketball, men's